The Prior of St Mary's Isle (later Commendator of St Mary's Isle) was the head of the Augustinian monastic community of St Mary's Isle Priory, in Kirkcudbrightshire, Galloway. The following is a list of priors and commendators:

List of priors

 William, x 1220
 David, 1273
 William de Kars, 1347
 Stephen de Malcarston, 1381-1406
 Patrick Wotherspoon, 1423-1426
 John de Inverkeithing, 1423
 Richard de Aberdour, 1424
 Henry de Dryden, 1424-1426
 James Cameron, 1426-1446
 John de Wardlaw, 1446-1481
 Robert Bellenden (Ballantyne), 1481-1484
 John Crawford, 1484-1512 x 1515
 William Crawford, 1501
 John Crichton, 1515-1525
 George Crichton, 1525-1526
 David Douglas, 1526
 William Douglas, 1526-1528
 John Campbell, 1526
 Adam Blackadder, 1527
 John Lamb, 1528
 John Leslie, 1528
 Gavin Leslie, 1528
 John Campbell (again), 1528
 Robert Erskine, 1528-1532

List of commendators

 John Douglas, 1528-1536
 David de Voyles, 1530
 David Paniter, 1536-1547
 Nicholas Williamson, 1536
 Robert Stirling, 1546-1558
 William Heslop, 1558
 Robert Richardson, 1558-1566
 John Wilson, 1558
 John Stevenson, 1561
 William Rutherford, 1566-1587

Notes

Bibliography
 Cowan, Ian B. & Easson, David E., Medieval Religious Houses: Scotland With an Appendix on the Houses in the Isle of Man, Second Edition, (London, 1976), pp. 96-7
 Watt, D.E.R. & Shead, N.F. (eds.), The Heads of Religious Houses in Scotland from the 12th to the 16th Centuries, The Scottish Records Society, New Series, Volume 24, (Edinburgh, 2001), pp. 193-7

See also
 Abbot of Holyrood
 St Mary's Isle Priory

Saint Mary's Isle
History of Galloway
Saint Mary's Isle